Neobolbodimyia is a genus of horse flies in the family Tabanidae.

Species
Neobolbodimyia nigra Ricardo, 1913

References

Tabanidae
Diptera of Australasia
Brachycera genera